Burnaby North—Seymour is a federal electoral district in British Columbia. It encompasses a portion of British Columbia previously included in the electoral districts of Burnaby—Douglas and North Vancouver.

Burnaby North—Seymour was created by the 2012 federal electoral boundaries redistribution and was legally defined in the 2013 representation order. It came into effect upon the call of the 42nd Canadian federal election, scheduled for October 2015.

Demographics

According to the Canada 2016 Census; 2013 representation

Languages: 58.2% English, 10.1% Cantonese, 7.7% Mandarin, 2.9% Italian, 2.6% Korean, 1.8% Persian, 1.7% Spanish, 1.4% Tagalog, 1.2% French
Religions (2011): 44.8% Christian (21.3% Catholic, 4.5% United Church, 4.0% Anglican, 1.5% Christian Orthodox, 1.3% Baptist, 1.2% Lutheran, 1.0% Presbyterian, 10.1% Other), 3.6% Buddhist, 2.9% Muslim, 45.6% No religion 
Median income (2015): $34,358 
Average income (2015): $49,497
Main industries: Professional, scientific and technical services (11.2% of labour force); Retail trade (10.4%); Educational services (9.4%); Health care and social assistance (9.0%)

Geography
As of the 2012 federal electoral boundaries redistribution, the district includes the portion of the City of Burnaby north of Highway 7, the portion of the District Municipality of North Vancouver east of the Seymour River and the southern section between west of the Seymour River and east of Lynn Creek and the Seymour Creek 2 and Burrard Inlet 3 Indian reserves.

Members of Parliament

This riding has elected the following members of the House of Commons of Canada:

Election results

Notes

References

Federal electoral districts in Greater Vancouver and the Fraser Valley
British Columbia federal electoral districts
North Vancouver (district municipality)
Politics of Burnaby